Anonychomyrma fornicata is a species of ant in the genus Anonychomyrma. Described by Emery in 1914, the species is endemic to Australia.

References

Anonychomyrma
Hymenoptera of Australia
Insects described in 1914
Taxa named by Carlo Emery